Diisobutylamine is a secondary amine containing two isobutyl groups. It is a weak base that is useful as an inhibitor of bacterial growth in floodwaters, as a precursor to various fertilizers, and a corrosion inhibitor.

Applications

Environmental 
Diisobutylamine has been used in water flooding operations to control the growth of sulfate reducing bacteria. When water was treated with low concentrations of diisobutylamine, the microorganisms usually present were killed. This has wide environmental impacts, because even microorganisms resistant to normal bactericides were removed from the water by the diisobutylamine.

Diisobutylamine is also used as a precursor to various fertilizers, and it is produced when plants or agents in soil break down butylate fertilizers.

Industrial 
In industry, diisobutylamine has many and various uses. First, it can be used as an agent to minimize corrosion in processes involving hydrocarbon streams which contain residual ammonia or amines. This is possible because the pKa of diisobutylamine is higher than that for almost all residual amines that may be contained in a stream. Thus, diisobutylamine is more basic and reacts preferentially with any mineral acids in the stream (i.e. HCl). Also because diisobutylamine is more basic, its conjugate acid is less acidic, leading to a less corrosive salt formed. In this way, the addition of diisobutylamine can significantly slow the corrosion process.

Another use of diisobutylamine is in preventing corrosion and cleaning surfaces containing titanium nitride (i.e. semiconductors in computer chips, solar panels, bioMEMS, etc.). When mixed with an oxidizing agent, water, and a borate species, the mixture can clean particles, residues, metal ion contaminants, and organic contaminants all without damaging the low-k dielectrics.

Diisobutylamine has also been used to help improve storage conditions of fuel oils. Commercial fuel oils are often subject to discoloration or formation of insoluble sludge during storage which causes a loss of value. However, when stored with amine salts containing diisobutylamine, the change in color or formation of sludge of the oil is significantly reduced.

Plastic polymers treated with basic species including diisobutylamine show rapid decrosslinking of the polymer network. This suggests that reworkable polymer materials could be formed that could easily be degraded and recycled.

Reactions
Diisobutylamine reacts with arylphosphonic dichlorides to give arylphosphonic amines.

Diisobutylamine reacts with dimethyldioxirane to give diisobutylhydroxylamine, as typical for oxidation of secondary amines to give hydroxylamines.

References 

Secondary amines
Corrosion inhibitors